William Ernest Eiffler (4 November 1925 – 2 June 2014) was an Australian rules footballer who played with Collingwood in the Victorian Football League (VFL).

Notes

External links 

Profile on Collingwood Forever

1925 births
2014 deaths
Australian rules footballers from Western Australia
Collingwood Football Club players
Subiaco Football Club players